Clutch was an online magazine and blog network whose stated target audience is "today's young, hip, progressive Black woman". The magazine was started as a print publication in 2002. It was part of Sutton Media. Following a temporary closure the magazine was relaunched as an online-only publication in 2007.

In 2009, digital media consultancy Elemental Interactive made a strategic investment in Clutch. Elemental (a former division of WPP plc's Grey Global Group), was to take an undisclosed stake in Atlanta-based Sutton Media, Clutch's publisher.

Sites on which articles from Clutch are republished include The Grio, a division of NBC News, a daily online news and opinion platform devoted to delivering stories and perspectives that reflect and affect African-American audiences.

Clutch's editorial staff included  Danielle Belton, Yesha Callahan, Britni Danielle, and Jessica Andrews.

References

External links
 

2002 establishments in Georgia (U.S. state)
2007 disestablishments in Georgia (U.S. state)
African-American magazines
Defunct women's magazines published in the United States
Magazines established in 2002
Magazines disestablished in 2007
Magazines published in Atlanta
Online magazines published in the United States
Online magazines with defunct print editions